FL3, FL-3, or similar may refer to:
 FL3 (flavagline), an organic compound that displays potent anticancer and cardioprotectant activities
 FL3 (Lazio regional railways)
 AVIA FL.3, an Italian two-seat cabin monoplane
 Florida State Road 3, also known as North Courtenay Parkway, a north–south road serving as the southern access for the Kennedy Space Center near Cape Canaveral, Florida
 Florida's 3rd congressional district, a congressional district in the U.S. state of Florida